St Ives North may refer to:
St Ives North (electoral division), an electoral division in Cornwall, United Kingdom
North St Ives, New South Wales, a suburb of St Ives, New South Wales, Australia
St Ives North Public School, the school within this suburb